Adaina thomae is a moth of the family Pterophoridae. It is found in Saint Thomas, Brazil, Hispaniola Mexico and Puerto Rico.

The wingspan is about 12 mm. Adults are white, with scattered black scales, forming somewhat larger dots at the middle of the wing before the notch, at the base of the notch, two on the costa of the first feather and two smaller bars at the base of the fringe of the second feather. The fringes are grey except on the tip of the second feather.

Adults have been recorded in February, July, August, October and December.

References

Moths described in 1877
Oidaematophorini